Alessandro Castracani or Alessandro Castracane (1580 – 22 July 1649) was a Roman Catholic prelate who served as Bishop of Fano (1643–1649),
Apostolic Collector to Portugal (1634–1640), 
Apostolic Nuncio to Savoy (1629–1634), and 
Bishop of Nicastro (1629–1632).

Biography
Alessandro Castracani was born in Fano, Italy in 1580.
On 11 October 1629, he was appointed during the papacy of Pope Urban VIII as Bishop of Nicastro and on 11 Oct 1629 as Apostolic Nuncio to Savoy.
On 28 October 1629, he was consecrated bishop by Luigi Caetani, Cardinal-Priest of Santa Pudenziana, with Pietro Francesco Montorio, Bishop Emeritus of Nicastro, and Francesco Venturi, Bishop Emeritus of San Severo, serving as co-consecrators.
On 22 June 1632, he resigned as Bishop of Nicastro and on 30 July 1634, he resigned as Apostolic Nuncio to Savoy.  
On 30 September 1634, he was appointed during the papacy of Pope Urban VIII as Apostolic Collector to Portugal where he served until his resignation on 15 November 1640.
On 22 June 1643, he was appointed during the papacy of Pope Urban VIII as Bishop of Fano.
He served as Bishop of Fano until his death on 22 July 1649.

Episcopal succession

References

External links and additional sources
 (for Chronology of Bishops) 
 
 
 (for Chronology of Bishops) 
 (for Chronology of Bishops)  
 (for Chronology of Bishops) 
 (for Chronology of Bishops)  

17th-century Italian Roman Catholic bishops
Bishops appointed by Pope Urban VIII
1580 births
1649 deaths
Apostolic Nuncios to Savoy